Daniel Galera (São Paulo, July 13, 1979) is a Brazilian writer, translator and editor. He was born in São Paulo, but was raised and spent most of his life in Porto Alegre, until 2005 when he went back to São Paulo. He is considered by critics to be one of the most influential young authors in Brazilian literature. 

 Between 1998 and 2001, as a student at the Federal University of Rio Grande do Sul, he wrote for the literary e-zine Cardosonline; among the collaborators were André Czarnobai (the founder),  Clara Averbuck and Daniel Pellizari. 

Daniel is one of the founders of the publishing house Livros do Mal and had some of his works adapted into plays and movies.

Works

Novels
Meia-Noite e Vinte (Midnight Twenty), Companhia das Letras, 2016
Barba ensopada de sangue (Blood-Drenched beard), Companhia das Letras, 2012;
Cordilheira (Mountain range),Companhia das Letras, 2008. 
Mãos de Cavalo (The Shape of Bones), Companhia das Letras, 2006;
Até o dia em que o cão morreu (Until the day the dog died), Livros do Mal, 2003.

Short stories

Dentes Guardados (Stored Teeth) , Livros do Mal, 2001.

Novellas 

 O deus das avencas (The God of Ferns), Companhia das Letras, 2021.

Comic books
 Cachalote, Quadrinhos na Cia. 2010. (writer; art by Rafael Coutinho).

Participation in anthologies

Lusofonica: La Nuova narrativa in Lingua Portoghese, La Nuova Frontiera, Itália, 2006.
Sex'n'Bossa, Mondadori, Itália, 2005;
Contos de Bolso, Casa Verde, 2005;
Os Cem Menores Contos Brasileiros do Século, Ateliê Editorial, 2004;
Contos de oficina 24, WS, 2000;
Literatura Século XXI, vol. 2, Blocos, 1999.

Translations
"Manuale per investire cani" (Dentes Guardados), Arcana Libri, Itália, 2004.
"Manos de caballo" (Mãos de Cavalo), Interzona, Argentina, 2007.
"Mãos de Cavalo"(Mãos de Cavalo), Portugal, Caminho, 2008.
"Sogni all'alba del ciclista urbano" (Mãos de Cavalo), Mondadori, Itália, 2008.
"Cordilheira" (Cordilheira), Portugal, Caminho, 2010.
"Paluche" (Mãos de Cavalo), Gallimard, France, 2010.
"Flut" (Barba ensopada de sangue), Suhrkamp Verlag, 2013.
 "Blood-Drenched Beard" (Barba ensopada de sangue), Hamish Hamilton, UK, 2014

Awards and recognitions
 Prêmio Açorianos de Literatura: Publishing House of the Year (Porto Alegre, 2003)
 2012 Granta Best of Young Brazilian Novelists
 2013 São Paulo Prize for Literature — Winner in the Best Book of the Year category for Barba ensopada de sangue

References

External links
Personal website – Portuguese

Brazilian male short story writers
21st-century Brazilian short story writers
Book editors
1979 births
Living people
21st-century Brazilian novelists
21st-century Brazilian male writers
Brazilian male novelists
Brazilian editors